Ivana Červenková (born 12 February 1962) is a Czech diplomat, serving as Consul General at the Consulate General of the Czech Republic in Munich since 2022.

Biography 
Červenková was born on February 22, 1962, in the statutory city of České Budějovice, located in the South Bohemian Region of the Czechia at the confluence of the Vltava and the Malše rivers.

Education 
Červenková graduated from the Faculty of Law of Charles University in 1984.

Diplomatic Career 
During her career as a diplomat, she was Chargé d'affaires at the Czech embassy in Vienna from 2012 until 2013 and Deputy Ambassador from 2010 until 2014. From 2018 to 2021, she served as the Czech Ambassador to Austria.

References

1962 births
Living people
People from České Budějovice
Ambassadors of the Czech Republic to Austria
Charles University alumni
Czech women ambassadors